Ana Martins (born 26 March 1972) is an Angolan swimmer. She competed in two events at the 1988 Summer Olympics.

References

External links
 

1972 births
Living people
Angolan female swimmers
Olympic swimmers of Angola
Swimmers at the 1988 Summer Olympics
Place of birth missing (living people)